Curro is an Andalusian diminutive of the male name Francisco.

People with the given name
 Curro (footballer, born 1981) (Antonio José González García), Spanish footballer
 Curro Montoya (born 1977), Spanish footballer
 Curro Romero (born 1933), Spanish bullfighter
 Curro Sánchez (born 1996), Spanish footballer
 Curro Savoy (born 1948), Spanish musician
 Curro Torres (born 1976), Spanish footballer
 Curro Vacas (born 1979), Spanish footballer

People with the surname
 Jeff Curro (born 1967), American radio personality
 John Curro (1932–2019), Australian violist, conductor, and music director
 Tracey Curro (born 1963), Australian journalist

See also

 Curro Jiménez, a Spanish television drama series
 Curro (mascot), the Seville Expo '92 mascot